Clyve is a surname. Notable people with the surname include:

John Clyve, English Gothic architect
John Clyve (MP) for Bristol (UK Parliament constituency)
Richard de Clyve, English medieval university chancellor
Geoffrey de Clyve (died 1119), English bishop

See also
Clive